Tyra of Denmark  (Tyri Haraldsdatter, Thyri  and Thyra)  was a 10th-century Danish princess. She was the spouse of both King Olav I of Norway and of Styrbjörn Starke, prince of Sweden.

Tyra was daughter of the Danish king Harald Bluetooth and thus a sister to King Sweyn Forkbeard. She was first married to the Swedish prince and throne claimant Styrbjörn Starke (Styrbjörn the Strong), son of King Olof Björnsson. However Styrbjörn Starke died in the Battle of Fýrisvellir (986) near Uppsala fighting with  his uncle King Eric the Victorious for the throne of Sweden.

According to Snorri Sturluson, she was next betrothed to the Wendish king Burislav, as part of a Danish-Wendic peace agreement negotiated by King Sweyn Forkbeard.  As part of the agreement, Sweyn married Gunhild of Wenden who was the sister of Burislav. However, after her hunger strike, Burislav sent her back to Denmark.

She subsequently arranged to have herself married to Olaf Tryggvason, King of Norway, to the displeasure of her brother Sweyn.   When Olaf married her, Sweyn refused to pay her promised dowry.  Olaf subsequently set out for Wendland to seek allies for a war on Denmark.  On the way Olaf was ambushed by Sweyn and an alliance which included Olof Skötkonung, King of Sweden, and Eirik Hákonarson, Jarl of Lade.  The resulting Battle of Svolder ended in the death of the Norwegian king (c. 1000). According to legend, Queen Tyra subsequently committed suicide by starvation after receiving news of her husband's death  at the battle.

References

Other sources
 Alf Henrikson: Dansk historia (Danish history) (1989) 
 Sven Rosborn: När hände vad i Nordens historia (When did what happen in the history of the Nordic countries) (1997) 
 Åke Ohlmarks: FornNordiskt Lexikon (Ancient Nordic dictionary) (1994)

External links
Queen Thyri and the Angelica Stalks from The Musician's Tale; The Saga of King Olaf by Henry Wadsworth Longfellow (1863)

Norwegian royal consorts
Danish princesses
Swedish princesses
House of Knýtlinga
10th-century Norwegian people
10th-century Norwegian women
10th-century Danish people
10th-century Danish women
Daughters of kings